The Men's Individual large hill/10 km at the FIS Nordic World Ski Championships 2013 was held on 28 February 2013. The ski jumping part of the event took place at 10:00 and the cross-country part at 15:00.

Results

Ski jumping
The ski jumping was held at 10:00.

Cross-country skiing 
The cross-country skiing part was started at 15:30.

References

FIS Nordic World Ski Championships 2013